For the taking: Volume I – From CHALDEA is an album by Nick Tosches and Rick Whitehurst. It features Tosches reading poetry from his book Chaldea and I Dig Girls set to an electronic soundscape by Whitehurst. Volume I is currently the only entry in the series.

Track listing
"Erebos" - 3:39
"May the Gods Without Names Forgive Me" - 3:17
"Ptolemy II" - 2:25
"Dante in Ravenna" - 3:01
"The Dreambook of Artemidorus" - 3:38
"All of Gust and Sigh" - 3:29
"Cybeles Night" - 2:01
"My Kind of Loving" - 3:30

Personnel
Nick Tosches – vocals, texts
Rick Whitehurst – music

Nick Tosches albums
2006 albums